Arkley may refer to multiple articles:

 Arkley, a small village in the London Borough of Barnet
 The Arkley (automobile), an English vehicle
 Howard Arkley (1951–1999), an Australian painter
 Arkley Lane and Pastures, a nature reserve in Arkley
 Arkley South Field, a nature reserve in Arkley

See also
 Arkie Whiteley (born 1964), daughter of Australian painter Brett Whiteley
 Arkle (1957–1970), an Irish racehorse